In the account of Terah's family mentioned in the Book of Genesis, Nahor II ( – Nāḥōr) is listed as the son of Terah, amongst two other brothers, Abram and Haran. His grandfather was Nahor I, son of Serug. Nahor married the daughter of his brother Haran, Milcah, his niece. They may all have been born and raised in the city of Ur: the biblical account states that "Haran died before his father Terah in the land of his birth, in Ur of the Chaldeans".

In the King James Version, Nahor is also referred to as Nachor.

When Abram had an encounter with God, this brother directed his family to leave their native land and go to the land of Canaan. Terah, their father, coordinated the gathering of his family to journey west to their destination. They followed the Euphrates River, with their herds, to the Paddan Aram region. This was about halfway along the Fertile Crescent between Mesopotamia and the Mediterranean, in what is now southeastern Turkey. In this region, Nahor and his family settled except for his brother Haran, who had died sometime ago back in Ur. The city where they settled, Harran, is the place where Nahor's father would die.

Nahor II continued his own travels and settled in the region of Aram Naharaim, where he founded the town of Nahor. Here, he and Milcah had eight sons:

 Uz, the firstborn
 Buz
 Kemuel
 Kesed
 Hazo
 Pildash
 Jidlaph
 Bethuel, father of Rebekah, the wife of Isaac

Nahor and his concubine, Reumah, also had four sons: Tebah, Gaham, Tahash, and Maacah.

Nahor in the Book of Joshua
In his final speech to the Israelite leaders assembled at Shechem, Joshua recounts the history of God's formation of the Israelite nation, beginning with "Terah the father of Abraham and Nachor, [who] lived beyond the Euphrates River and worshiped other gods".

In popular culture 
Nahor is portrayed by Kevin McNally in the film Abraham (1993). The character of Nahor's concubine Reumah is portrayed by Evelina Meghangi in the same film.

See also 
 Harran, the city where the family first settled (spelled differently in Hebrew from the family name of Haran).

References 

Family of Abraham
Noach (parashah)
Ur of the Chaldees